"Dúan in chóicat cest" ("a poem in fifty questions") is a medieval school poem in Middle Irish, also known by its incipit "Iarfaigid lib cóecait cest."

Overview

The poem was sourced from British Library, MS Egerton 1782 and first published by Kuno Meyer in Zeitschrift für celtische Philologie in 1903.

The text is in the form of fifty questions on Old Testament history and theology. Notable features include:
The claim that Elias and Enoch are unhappy in Paradise
the use of the name Seiri or Seiria for China, derived from Greek Serica.
The claim of Cain as inventor of agriculture

See also

 Irish poetry

References

External links
Full text on CELT
 Zeitschrift für celtische Philologie 4; the Duan in choicet cest is on pages 234–240

Irish literature
Irish poems
Early Irish literature
Medieval poetry